WYNZ (100.9 MHz, "Rewind 100.9"), is a commercial FM radio station licensed to South Portland, Maine, and serving the Portland metropolitan area.  It is owned by Saga Communications and airs a classic hits radio format.  The studios and offices are on Western Avenue in South Portland.

WYNZ has an effective radiated power (ERP) of 25,000 watts, but from a tower at only 93 meters (305 ft) in height above average terrain (HAAT), limiting its coverage area.  That contrasts with other Portland stations such as WBLM and WFNK that have taller towers and are powered at 100,000 watts.  WYNZ's transmitter is behind the studios in South Portland, near the Maine Turnpike.

History

WRQN and WLOB-FM
On January 13, 1976, the station signed on as WRQN.  It was a hot adult contemporary station.  WRQN originally was licensed to Westbrook and owned by Japat, Inc.

WRQN was powered at less than 1,000 watts, only heard in Portland and its adjacent suburbs.  In 1978, it was sold to the owners of 1310 AM WLOB, whose management changed the FM station to album-oriented rock (AOR) as WLOB-FM.

Portland's Best Rock
In the late 1970s, WLOB-FM was known as "FM 101 - Portland's Best Rock", giving progressive rock station 107.5 WBLM some serious competition and sometimes beating WBLM in the ratings as well.  In late 1980, the station was sold to Eastman Broadcasting, which was also in the process of purchasing 970 AM WCSH (now WZAN).

Eastman changed WLOB-FM's call sign to WYNZ-FM in December 1980, while AM 970 became WYNZ, simulcasting the FM station.  The AOR format remained. For the next year, the station was known as "Z101 - Portland's Best Rock".  Some of the DJs on "FM101/Z101-Portland's Best Rock" included Danny Shewster, G.V. Rapp, John Clark, Karen (Tucker) Payson, Bennie Green, Scott Schuster, Will Jackson and Jeff Spicer.

Adult Contemporary and Oldies
Eastman changed WYNZ-FM to an adult contemporary music format in November, 1981, calling the station Y101.  At that point, Z101 veteran John Clark defected to Album Rock competitor WBLM and the new on-air line-up included morning man Bob Rose as well as Dean Rogers, Andy Kosinski and later Ted Talbot.  WYNZ-AM-FM were sold to Buckley Broadcasting in the mid-1980s with the Y101 adult contemporary format remained in place.

In 1989, WYNZ changed formats to Oldies.  It was known as "Portland's Solid Gold, Y101-FM" playing hits from the 1950s, 1960s and 1970s.  Bob Rose remained on mornings as well as Ted Talbot handling afternoons.  Andy Kosinski was the evening voice.  Chuck Igo joined the station to handle middays.  Bob Rose exited the station in the early 1990s and Dean Rogers returned to the FM side of the WYNZ operation to handle mornings.

Sale to Saga
In 1993, WYNZ-AM-FM were bought by Saga Communications for $350,000.  Saga switched AM 970 to a hot talk format as WZAN, while the FM station was re-branded as "Oldies 100.9 WYNZ."  The Oldies on-air staff included Dean Rogers, Chuck Igo and Ted Talbot.  After the departure of Igo (1994) and Rogers (1997), Bob Anderson assumed mornings until his untimely passing in 2003 while hosting his Saturday morning shift. Anderson was 59. Igo, who had returned to the station in late 2001 to handle afternoons, moved into the morning show. Corey Garrison, Ken McGrail, Gary "The K" Koblara, Mike Kimball, Ed Petty, Jeff Pierce, Chris Harper and the late Tom Kelly (Tom Pagnotti) have handled air duties.

In 2007, WYNZ evolved, eliminating the hits of the 1950s, and moving the format forward to incorporate hits from the 1980s, re-branding as "Big Hits Y100.9."  In 2009, the station changed its city of license from Westbrook to South Portland.

Rewind 100.9
In April 2013, WYNZ re-branded to "Rewind 100.9," playing hits from the late 1960s, 1970s and 1980s.

Around 2015, the station began focusing on a playlist from the 1970s, 1980s and 1990s.  The main competitor for WYNZ is Binnie-owned classic hits station 107.5 WFNK, "Frank FM."  While WYNZ plays some pop and dance hits from artists such as Michael Jackson and Madonna, Frank FM leans more toward classic rock.

WYNZ-HD2
On November 1, 2019, WYNZ launched an oldies format on its HD2 subchannel, branded as "Pure Oldies 105.5"(simulcast on translator W288CU 105.5 FM Portland).

Translator

References

External links
WYNZ Website

YNZ
Classic hits radio stations in the United States
Mass media in Cumberland County, Maine
Radio stations established in 1976
South Portland, Maine
1976 establishments in Maine